Caffeine is an alkaloid present in certain plants, such as coffee and tea.

Caffeine may also refer to:

Music
 Caffeine (album), by the eponymous free improvisation trio
 Caféine, a 2009 album by Christophe Willem
 "Caffeine", a song by Patty Larkin on her 1987 album I'm Fine
 "Caffeine", a song by Faith No More on their 1992 album Angel Dust
 "Caffeine", a song by The Dillinger Escape Plan on their debut EP The Dillinger Escape Plan
 "Caffeine", a song by Psychostick on their 2006 album, Sandwich
 "Caffeine", a song by Yang Yo-seob on his first EP The First Collage
 "Caffeine", a song by Jeff Williams & Casey Lee Williams on their album RWBY: Volume 2 Soundtrack

Other uses
 Caffeine (film)
 Caffeine (service), a livestreaming service
 Caffeine (video game)
 Google Caffeine, a redesigned Google search architecture

See also
 
 Cathine, a psychoactive drug
 Kaffeine, media player software for KDE